Public law  is the part of law that governs relations between legal persons and a government, between different institutions within a state, between different branches of governments, as well as relationships between persons that are of direct concern to society. Public law comprises constitutional law, administrative law, tax law and criminal law, as well as all procedural law. Laws concerning relationships between individuals belong to private law.

The relationships public law governs are asymmetric and unequalized. Government bodies (central or local) can make decisions about the rights of persons. However, as a consequence of the rule-of-law doctrine, authorities may only act within the law (secundum et intra legem). The government must obey the law. For example, a citizen unhappy with a decision of an administrative authority can ask a court for judicial review.

The distinction between public law and private law dates back to Roman law, where the Roman jurist Ulpian ( 170 – 228) first noted it. It was later adopted to understand the legal systems both of countries that adhere to the civil-law tradition, and of those that adhere to common-law tradition.

The borderline between public law and private law is not always clear. Law as a whole cannot neatly be divided into "law for the State" and "law for everyone else". As such, the distinction between public and private law is largely functional rather than factual, classifying laws according to which domain the activities, participants, and principal concerns involved best fit into. This has given rise to attempts to establish a theoretical understanding for the basis of public law.

History of public law

The distinction between public and private law was first made by Roman jurist Ulpian, who argues in the Institutes (in a passage preserved by Justinian in the Digest ) that "[p]ublic law is that which respects the establishment of the Roman commonwealth, private that which respects individuals' interests, some matters being of public and others of private interest." Furthermore, he defines public law as the law concerning religious affairs, the priesthood, and offices of the State. Roman Law conceived of the law as a series of relationships between persons and persons, persons and things, and persons and the State. Public law consisted of the latter of these three relationships. However, Roman lawyers devoted little attention to this area, and instead focussed largely on areas of private law. It was, however, of great importance in Teutonic society, as noted by German legal historian Otto von Gierke, who defined the Teutons as the fathers of public law.

Drawing a line between public and private law largely fell out of favor in the ensuing millennium, though, as Ernst Kantorowicz notes, Medieval saw a concern with the Roman conception of the res publica inherent in the legal fiction of the king's two bodies. However, legal philosophers during this period consisted largely of theologians who operated within the realm of Canon Law, and were instead concerned with distinctions between divine law, natural law, and human law. The "public/private" divide in law would not return until the 17th and 18th centuries. Through the emergence of the nation-state and new theories of sovereignty, notions of a distinctly public realm began to crystalize. However, the claims made by monarchs, and later parliaments, to an unrestrained power to make law spurred attempts to establish a distinctly private sphere that would be free from encroaching State power in return.

Public law in civil law and common law jurisdictions

Traditionally, the division between public and private law has been made in the context of the legal systems found in Continental Europe, whose laws all fall within the tradition of civil law. However, the public/private divide does not apply strictly to civil law systems. Given public law's emphasis on aspects of the State that are true of all systems of government and law, common law legal systems acknowledge, even if they do so unconsciously, that actions which must be prohibited by the State need not necessarily be prohibited for private parties as well. As such, legal scholars commenting on common law systems, such as England and Canada, have made this distinction as well.

For many years, public law occupied a marginal position in continental European law. By and large, private law was considered general law. Public law, on the other hand, was considered to consist of exceptions to this general law. It was not until the second half of the twentieth century that public law began to play a prominent role in European society through the constitutionalization of private law, as well as the development of administrative law and various functional fields of law, including labor law, medical law, and consumer law. Though this began to blur the distinction between public and private law, it did not erode the former. Instead, it elevated public law from its once marginal state, with an acknowledgment that there are few, if any, areas of the law that are free from potential State intervention. In Italy, for example, the development of public law was considered a project of state-building, following the ideas of Vittorio Emanuele Orlando. Indeed, many early Italian public lawyers were also politicians, including Orlando himself. Now, in countries such as France, public law now refers to the areas of constitutional law, administrative law, and criminal law.

Areas of public law

Constitutional law 

In modern states, constitutional law lays out the foundations of the state. Above all, it postulates the supremacy of law in the functioning of the state – the rule of law.

Secondly, it sets out the form of government – how its different branches work, how they are elected or appointed, and the division of powers and responsibilities between them. Traditionally, the basic elements of government are the executive, the legislature and the judiciary.

And thirdly, in describing what are the basic human rights, which must be protected for every person, and what further civil and political rights citizens have, it sets the fundamental borders to what any government must and must not do.

In most jurisdictions, constitutional law is enshrined in a written document, the Constitution, sometimes together with amendments or other constitutional laws. In some countries, however, such a supreme entrenched written document does not exist for historical and political reasons – the Constitution of the United Kingdom is an unwritten one.

Administrative law 

Administrative law refers to the body of law that regulates bureaucratic managerial procedures and defines the powers of administrative agencies. These laws are enforced by the executive branch of a government rather than the judicial or legislative branches (if they are different in that particular jurisdiction). This body of law regulates international trade, manufacturing, pollution, taxation, and the like. This is sometimes seen as a subcategory of civil law and sometimes seen as public law as it deals with regulation and public institutions

Criminal law

Tax law 

Tax law first became an area of public law during the 17th century, as a consequence of new theories of sovereignty that began to emerge. Until this point, taxes were considered gifts under the law, given to the State by a private donor – the taxpayer. It is now considered an area of public law, as it concerns a relationship between persons and the State.

Theoretical distinction between private and public law
The analytical and historical distinction between public and private law has emerged predominantly in the legal systems of continental Europe. As a result, German-language legal literature has produced extensive discussion on the precise nature of the distinction between public law and private law. Several theories have evolved, which are neither exhaustive nor mutually exclusive or separate.

The interest theory of public law emerges from the work of Roman jurist Ulpian, who stated "Publicum ius est, quod ad statum rei Romanae spectat, privatum quod ad singulorum utilitatem. (Public law is that, which concerns Roman state, private law is concerned with the interests of citizens.) Charles-Louis Montesquieu elaborates upon this theory in The Spirit of the Laws, published during the 18th century, wherein Montesquieu establishes a distinction between international (right of nations), public (political right), and private (civil right) law according to various actors interests and rights.

Criticisms of interest theory include the difficulty in establishing a clear distinction between private and public interest, if such a distinction does exist, and categorizing laws accordingly.

The subjection theory focuses on explaining the distinction by emphasizing the subordination of private persons to the state. Public law is supposed to govern this relationship, whereas private law is considered to govern relationships where the parties involved meet on a level playing field. However, some areas commonly considered private law also imply subordination, such as employment law. Moreover, legal proceedings wherein the State is a party may undermine the totality of the State's authority, and the degree to which private persons are subordinate to the State, if a Court finds in favor of a non-State party (see Carpenter v. United States, for example).

The subject theory is concerned with the position of the subject of law in the legal relationship in question. If it finds itself in a particular situation as a public person (due to membership in some public body, such as a state or a municipality), public law applies, otherwise it is private law.

A combination of the subjection theory and the subject theory arguably provides a workable distinction. Under this approach, a field of law is considered public law where one actor is a public authority endowed with the power to act unilaterally (imperium) and this actor uses that imperium in the particular relationship. In other words, all depends whether the public authority is acting as a public or a private entity, say when ordering office supplies. This latest theory considers public law a special instance.

There are areas of law that do not seem to fit into either public or private law, such as employment law – parts of it look like private law (the employment contract) while other parts look like public law (the activities of an employment inspectorate when investigating workplace safety).

The distinction between public and private law might purely academic, but it also affects legal practice. It has bearing on the delineation between competences of different courts and administrative bodies. Under the Austrian constitution, for example, private law is among the exclusive competences of federal legislation, whereas public law is partly a matter of state legislation.

See also
Social law

Notes

References